Hypotacha fiorii is a species of moth in the family Erebidae. It is found in Eritrea, Ethiopia, and Niger.

References

Moths described in 1943
Hypotacha
Moths of Africa